is a potentially hazardous asteroid of the Apollo class, discovered by the Mount Lemmon Survey on 9 November 2008. It has an average estimated diameter of 260 meters according to NASA's Center for Near-Earth Object Studies. The object is not risk-listed.

See also

References 

Potentially hazardous asteroids
Discoveries by MLS
Minor planet object articles (unnumbered)
Earth-crossing asteroids
20081109